Baltasar del Alcázar (1530 in Seville, Spain–16 February 1606 in Ronda) was a Spanish poet. He was the sixth child of Luis del Alcázar. His poetry was about life and love, most of it spiced with a keen sense of humor.

Works

A short example of his poetry is Tres Cosas (Three Things):

Epigrams
 A un giboso de delante
 A una mujer escuálida
 Constanza
 Dios nos guarde
 Doña Valentina
 El estudiante (The Student)
 Hiere la hermosa Elvira...
 Entraron en una danza... (El baile)
 Job
 La capa (The Hat)
 La nariz de Clara
 Los ojos de Ana
 Salir por pies
 Preso de amores
 Su modo de vivir en la vejez
 Una cena jocosa
 Yo acuerdo revelaros un secreto.

Sonnets
 A Cristo
 Al amor
 Cercada está mi alma de contrarios
 Di, rapaz mentiroso.

Other
 Cena jocosa
 Diálogo entre dos perrillos
 Diálogo entre un galán y el eco
 Consejos a una viuda.

Notes

External links

Poesía de Baltasar del Alcazar web site with many poems written by Baltasar del Alcázar (in Spanish). It also has audio files.
 
 
Audio of Una cena jocosa, recorded by Adolfo Marsillach — palabravirtual.com .
Digital works of Alcázar at the Biblioteca Digital Hispánica (Hispanic Digital Library) of the National Library of Spain

Spanish poets
1530 births
1606 deaths
Spanish male poets